Kim Young-sook (born 1947) was the second wife of Kim Jong-il. She was the daughter of a high-ranking military official, and was a switchboard operator in North Hamgyong Province before moving to Pyongyang. Kim Jong-il's father, Kim Il-sung, handpicked her to marry his son. The two had been estranged for some years before his death. Kim Young-sook had a daughter from this marriage, Kim Sol-song (born 1974).

Song Hye-rang, the sister of Kim Jong-il's first mistress Song Hye-rim, mentioned that she is "insignificant to Kim Jong-il, apart from being a legitimate wife in front of Kim Il-sung. She did not even have an identity card in North Korea" as noted in her memoir Rattan house.

References

Living people
People from Pyongyang
1947 births
Kim dynasty (North Korea)
Switchboard operators